The following is a list of clubs who played in the original Midland Football League from its formation in 1889 until it closed in 1982.

Clubs

 Alfreton Town
 Appleby Frodingham
 Arnold (first team and reserves)
 Arnold Kingswell
 Ashby Institute
 Ashington
 Ashton United
 Attenborough
 Barnsley (first team and reserves)
 Barton Town
 Belper Town (first team and reserves)
 Blyth Spartans
 Borrowash Victoria
 Boston
 Boston Town
 Boston United
 Bourne Town
 Bradford City (reserves only)
 Bradford Park Avenue (reserves only)
 Bridlington Trinity
 Brigg Town
 Brimington
 Burslem Port Vale
 Burton Town
 Burton United (reserves only)
 Carrvale United
 Castleford Town
 Chesterfield (first team and reserves)
 Clay Cross Works
 Clifton All Whites (first team and reserves)
 Coalville Town
 Consett
 Corby Town
 Creswell Colliery
 Denaby United
 Derby County (reserves only)
 Derby Junction
 Derby Midland
 Dinnington Colliery
 Doncaster Rovers (first team and reserves)
 Dresden United
 Eastwood Town (first team and reserves)
 Folk House Old Boys
 Frickley Colliery
 Gainsborough Trinity (first team and reserves)
 Gateshead
 Glossop North End
 Goole Town
 Graham Street Prims
 Grantham
 Greenhalgh's
 Grimsby Town (first team and reserves)
 Guisborough Town
 Halifax Town (first team and reserves)
 Harrogate
 Heanor Town
 Heckmondwike
 Hednesford
 Hinckley Town
 Holbeach United
 Horden Colliery Welfare
 Huddersfield Town (first team and reserves)
 Hull City (reserves only)
 Ilkeston Town (first team and reserves)
 Kettering
 Kidderminster
 Kimberley Town (first team and reserves)
 King's Lynn
 Leeds City (reserves only)
 Leeds United (first team and reserves)
 Leek
 Leicester Fosse (first team and reserves)
 Linby Colliery Welfare
 Lincoln City (first team and reserves)
 Lockheed Leamington
 Long Eaton
 Long Eaton Grange
 Long Eaton Rangers
 Long Eaton United (first team and reserves)
 Loughborough Corinthians
 Loughborough
 Loughborough United
 Louth United
 Mansfield
 Mansfield Town
 Matlock
 Matlock Town
 Mexborough
 Mexborough Athletic
 Mexborough Town
 Newark
 North Shields
 Northampton Town
 Norwich City (reserves only)
 Nottingham Forest (reserves only)
 Notts County
 Notts Rangers
 Oakham United
 Ollerton Colliery
 Peterborough United
 Ransome & Marles
 Retford Rail
 Retford Town (first team and reserves)
 Ripley Town
 Rolls Royce Hucknall
 Rotherham County (first team and reserves)
 Rotherham Town [I]
 Rotherham Town [II]
 Rotherham United (reserves only)
 Rushden Town
 Scarborough
 Scunthorpe United (first team and reserves)
 Sheffield
 Sheffield United
 Shepshed Charterhouse
 Shirebrook
 Shrewsbury Town
 Silverwood Colliery
 Skegness Town
 South Shields
 Spalding United
 Spennymoor United
 Stamford
 Staveley
 Staveley Welfare
 Staveley Works
 Stockport County
 Stockton
 Stoke Swifts
 Sutton Town (first team and reserves)
 Sutton Trinity
 The Wednesday (reserves only)
 TI Chesterfield
 Wakefield City
 Walsall
 Warley
 Warwick County
 Wath Athletic
 Wednesbury Old Athletic
 Wellingborough
 Whitwick White Cross
 Wisbech Town
 Wombwell
 Worksop Town
 York City [I]
 York City [II]

References

Midland Football League (1889) Clubs